A non-Newtonian fluid is a fluid that does not follow Newton's law of viscosity, that is, it has variable viscosity dependent on stress. In non-Newtonian fluids, viscosity can change when under force to either more liquid or more solid. Ketchup, for example, becomes runnier when shaken and is thus a non-Newtonian fluid.

Most commonly, the viscosity (the gradual deformation by shear or tensile stresses) of non-Newtonian fluids is dependent on shear rate or shear rate history. Some non-Newtonian fluids with shear-independent viscosity, however, still exhibit normal stress-differences or other non-Newtonian behavior. In a Newtonian fluid, the relation between the shear stress and the shear rate is linear, passing through the origin, the constant of proportionality being the coefficient of viscosity. In a non-Newtonian fluid, the relation between the shear stress and the shear rate is different. The fluid can even exhibit time-dependent viscosity. Therefore, a constant coefficient of viscosity cannot be defined.

Although the concept of viscosity is commonly used in fluid mechanics to characterize the shear properties of a fluid, it can be inadequate to describe non-Newtonian fluids. They are best studied through several other rheological properties that relate stress and strain rate tensors under many different flow conditions—such as oscillatory shear or extensional flow—which are measured using different devices or rheometers. The properties are better studied using tensor-valued constitutive equations, which are common in the field of continuum mechanics.

Types of non-Newtonian behavior

Summary

Shear thickening fluid
The viscosity of a shear thickening fluid, or dilatant fluid, appears to increase when the shear rate increases. Corn starch suspended in water ("oobleck", see below) is a common example: when stirred slowly it looks milky, when stirred vigorously it feels like a very viscous liquid.

Shear thinning fluid

A familiar example of the opposite, a shear thinning fluid, or pseudoplastic fluid, is wall paint: The paint should flow readily off the brush when it is being applied to a surface but not drip excessively. Note that all thixotropic fluids are extremely shear thinning, but they are significantly time dependent, whereas the colloidal "shear thinning" fluids respond instantaneously to changes in shear rate. Thus, to avoid confusion, the latter classification is more clearly termed pseudoplastic.

Another example of a shear thinning fluid is blood. This application is highly favoured within the body, as it allows the viscosity of blood to decrease with increased shear strain rate.

Bingham plastic
Fluids that have a linear shear stress/shear strain relationship but require a finite yield stress before they begin to flow (the plot of shear stress against shear strain does not pass through the origin) are called Bingham plastics. Several examples are clay suspensions, drilling mud, toothpaste, mayonnaise, chocolate, and mustard. The surface of a Bingham plastic can hold peaks when it is still. By contrast Newtonian fluids have flat featureless surfaces when still.

Rheopectic or anti-thixotropic
There are also fluids whose strain rate is a function of time. Fluids that require a gradually increasing shear stress to maintain a constant strain rate are referred to as rheopectic. An opposite case of this is a fluid that thins out with time and requires a decreasing stress to maintain a constant strain rate (thixotropic).

Examples
Many common substances exhibit non-Newtonian flows. These include:

 Soap solutions, cosmetics, and toothpaste
 Food such as butter, cheese, jam, mayonnaise, soup, taffy, and yogurt 
 Natural substances such as magma, lava, gums, honey, and extracts such as vanilla extract
 Biological fluids such as blood, saliva, semen, mucus, and synovial fluid
 Slurries such as cement slurry and paper pulp, emulsions such as mayonnaise, and some kinds of dispersions

Oobleck

An inexpensive, non-toxic example of a non-Newtonian fluid is a suspension of starch (e.g., cornstarch/cornflour) in water, sometimes called "oobleck", "ooze", or "magic mud" (1 part of water to 1.5–2 parts of corn starch). The name "oobleck" is derived from the Dr. Seuss book Bartholomew and the Oobleck.

Because of its dilatant properties, oobleck is often used in demonstrations that exhibit its unusual behavior. A person may walk on a large tub of oobleck without sinking due to its shear thickening properties, as long as the individual moves quickly enough to provide enough force with each step to cause the thickening. Also, if oobleck is placed on a large subwoofer driven at a sufficiently high volume, it will thicken and form standing waves in response to low frequency sound waves from the speaker. If a person were to punch or hit oobleck, it would thicken and act like a solid. After the blow, the oobleck will go back to its thin liquid-like state.

Flubber (slime)

Flubber, also commonly known as slime, is a non-Newtonian fluid, easily made from polyvinyl alcohol–based glues (such as white "school" glue) and borax. It flows under low stresses but breaks under higher stresses and pressures. This combination of fluid-like and solid-like properties makes it a Maxwell fluid. Its behaviour can also be described as being viscoplastic or gelatinous.

Chilled caramel topping
Another example of this is chilled caramel ice cream topping (so long as it incorporates hydrocolloids such as carrageenan and gellan gum). The sudden application of force—by stabbing the surface with a finger, for example, or rapidly inverting the container holding it—causes the fluid to behave like a solid rather than a liquid. This is the "shear thickening" property of this non-Newtonian fluid. More gentle treatment, such as slowly inserting a spoon, will leave it in its liquid state. Trying to jerk the spoon back out again, however, will trigger the return of the temporary solid state.

Silly Putty

Silly Putty is a silicone polymer based suspension that will flow, bounce, or break, depending on strain rate.

Plant resin

Plant resin is a viscoelastic solid polymer. When left in a container, it will flow slowly as a liquid to conform to the contours of its container. If struck with greater force, however, it will shatter as a solid.

Quicksand

Quicksand is a shear thinning non-Newtonian colloid that gains viscosity at rest. Quicksand's non-Newtonian properties can be observed when it experiences a slight shock (for example, when someone walks on it or agitates it with a stick), shifting between its Gel and Sol phase and seemingly liquefying, causing objects on the surface of the quicksand to sink.

Ketchup
Ketchup is a shear thinning fluid. Shear thinning means that the fluid viscosity decreases with increasing shear stress. In other words, fluid motion is initially difficult at slow rates of deformation, but will flow more freely at high rates. Shaking an inverted bottle of ketchup can cause it to transition to a lower viscosity, resulting in a sudden gush of the shear-thinned condiment.

Dry granular flows
Under certain circumstances, flows of granular materials can be modelled as a continuum, for example using the μ(I) rheology. Such continuum models tend to be non-Newtonian, since the apparent viscosity of granular flows increases with pressure and decreases with shear rate. The main difference is the shearing stress and rate of shear.

See also
 Complex fluid
 Dilatant
 Dissipative particle dynamics
 Generalized Newtonian fluid
 Herschel–Bulkley fluid
 Liquefaction 
 Navier–Stokes equations
 Newtonian fluid
 Pseudoplastic
 Quicksand
 Quick clay
 Rheology
 Superfluids
 Thixotropy
 Weissenberg effect

References

External links

 

Continuum mechanics
Fluid dynamics
 
Viscosity
Polymers
Tribology